The 1979–80 IHF Women's Cup Winners' Cup was the fourth edition of IHF's competition for European women's handball national cup champions. Running from 24 November 1979 to 30 March 1980, it was contested by 14 teams, one less than the preceding edition. East Germany, Hungary and the Soviet Union, which had dominated the three first editions, didn't take part in the competition.

The final, confronting Iskra Partizánske and Lokomotiva Zagreb, was decided in a penalty shootout as both games ended in a 16–16 draw. Iskra won the shootout to become the second Czechoslovak team to win a European women's handball trophy. As of 2013 it remains the only team from former Czechoslovakia that has won the Cup Winners' Cup.

Results

References

Women's EHF Cup Winners' Cup
1979 in handball
1980 in handball